Jihad (Points of Order) is an album by American composer Bill Laswell, issued under the moniker Automaton. It was released on October 11, 1994 by Strata. Lisa Carr of the music journal Option favored Jihad over Automaton's previous release, saying it "deftly balances the cool, ambient sheen of Tetsu Inoue's electronics with the warm textures of Nicky Skopelitis' guitar and the unexpected pleasures of violinist Lili Haydn."

Track listing

Personnel 
Adapted from the Jihad (Points of Order) liner notes.

Musicians
Lili Haydn – violin
Tetsu Inoue – electronics
Bill Laswell – bass guitar, programming, producer
Nicky Skopelitis – guitar, effects

Technical
Layng Martine – assistant engineer
Robert Musso – engineering, effects

Release history

References

External links 
 
 Jihad (Points of Order) at Bandcamp

1994 albums
Bill Laswell albums
Albums produced by Bill Laswell
Strata (record label) albums